The Cardamom Hills or Yela Mala are mountain range of southern India and part of the southern Western Ghats located in Idukki district, Kerala, India. Their name comes from the cardamom spice grown in much of the hills' cool elevation, which also supports pepper and coffee. The Western Ghats and Periyar Sub-Cluster including the Cardamom Hills are UNESCO World Heritage Sites.

Geography

They cover about 2,800 km2 of mountainous terrain with deep valleys, and includes the drainages of the west flowing Periyar, Mullayar and Pamba rivers. It includes Idukki Dam and Mullaperiyar Dam. They conjoin the Anaimalai Hills to the northwest, the Palani Hills to the northeast and the Pothigai to the south as far as the Aryankavu pass (at c. 9° N). The crest of the hills form the boundary between Kerala and Tamil Nadu. Anamudi in Eravikulam National Park, is the highest peak in Western ghats and also the highest point in India south of the Himalayas.

Peaks in Cardamom Hills (Elephant Hills)

Climate
The hills experience average daily temperatures of 15 °C in winter to 31 °C in summer (April–May). The annual rainfall of 2,000 mm to 3,000 mm in Periyar decreases to less than 1,500 mm in the east in Srivilliputtur Wildlife Sanctuary. On the western side, two-thirds of the precipitation is received during the southwest monsoon from June to September. The areas also receive rainfall from the northeast monsoon (October–December) and from pre-monsoon showers (April–May).

Biome protection
These hills are made up largely of several contiguous protected areas intended to restrict human access, protect specific endangered species and preserve some of the still undeveloped forest biomes. The central part of the hills comprise the Periyar Wildlife Sanctuary covering an area of 777 km2. The 350 km2 core zone of the sanctuary is the Periyar National Park and Tiger Reserve. Periyar is a major ecotourism destination.

To the south of the Periyar Tiger Reserve are the reserve forests of the Ranni, Konni and Achankovil Forest Divisions. The Srivilliputtur Wildlife Sanctuary and reserved forests of the Tirunelveli Forest Division are contiguous with Periyar on the eastern side of the hills in Tamil Nadu in the rain-shadow area with mostly drier forests. The Meghamalai reserve forest, also contiguous with Periyar, is proposed to be the 600 km2 Meghamalai Wildlife Sanctuary to protect several threatened species including: Bengal tiger, Indian elephant, Nilgiri tahr, lion-tailed macaque, slender loris, grizzled giant squirrel, Salim Ali's fruit bat, great Indian hornbill, Hutton's pitviper and Vindhyan bob butterfly.

Cardamom Hill Reserve
The Cardamom Hill was an administrative area under two revenue officers (Tahasildar) created by the royal proclamation of Kingdom of Travancore in April 1822 to promote cardamom cultivation and to give facilities and protection to cardamom farmers. The Cardamom Hill Reserve (CHR) is within the Cardamom Hills Idukki District. But the extent of land in accordance with the boundaries of the notification is about 334 Sq miles (2,13,720 acres). It is bordered by the Tamil Nadu border to the east, Periyar Wildlife Sanctuary on the south, the Periyar River on the west, and Bodimettu, Chokkanad and Muthirapuzha to the north. The rain forests of CHR are a natural wildlife corridor to Periyar National Park from the Anaimalai Hills and Palani hills of Tamil Nadu and is the catchment area of six major hydro-electric projects in Idukki District. Now it is situated in the Idukki District of Kerala.

According to the Chief Secretary of the Government of Kerala, Cardamom Hill land is Government land under the control of the Revenue Department for more than a century. The balance of 
 is leased to farmers for cardamom cultivation The CHR accounts for about 70 percent of the cardamom production of India. CHR contains the Cardamom Research Station, situated in the Pampadumpara village of Udumbanchola taluk. It is located on the eastern side of Kumily-Munnar road. See:map.

CHR is the centre of a controversy between the Forest Department and the Revenue Department over control of the cardamom plantations in the reserve. Non-cardamom cultivation, illegal land conversion and large scale destruction of trees in the CHR have been blamed for flash-floods and landslips in Idukki and siltation problems in the Idukki dam.

According to the report dated 7 September 2005 of the Central Empowered Committee, appointed by the Supreme Court of India, the status of the Cardamom Hill Reserve is forest, and the extent is about 334 sq miles. The CEC concludes that in the Cardamom Hill Reserve, which still holds dense forest, illegal assignment of lands or grant of patta, illegal sales of land, large scale encroachments, transfer and sale of land and consequent deforestation, by the rich, the powerful and the influential, continue unabated in gross violation of the Forest (Conservation) Act, 1980 and this Honourable Court’s order dated 12 December 1996. This is causing irretrievable and immense loss to the dense evergreen forest holding rich bio-diversity on steep slopes and destroying the watersheds, water catchments and streams and rivers which flow through these forests.

References

External links

 "Kerala Red Grabs Kerala Green", Tehelka, 14 April 2007

Mountains of the Western Ghats
Hills of Kerala
Hills of Tamil Nadu
Geography of Idukki district
Tourist attractions in Idukki district